Mark Bardei (born 15 July 1996) is a Ukrainian pair skater. With former partner, Justine Brasseur for Canada, he is the 2019 CS Warsaw Cup bronze medalist.

He previously represented Ukraine with former partner Renata Ohanesian. They won three ISU Junior Grand Prix medals, including gold at 2015 JGP Latvia, and three Ukrainian senior national titles, and placed fourth at the 2016 World Junior Championships.

Career

Early years 
Bardei began learning to skate in 2001. He and Renata Ohanesian made their international debut in March 2012 at the International Challenge Cup, placing fifth in junior pairs.

2014–2015 season
In the 2014–15 season, Ohanesian/Bardei won the junior gold medal at the Lombardia Trophy in September 2014. The following week, they competed at their first ISU Junior Grand Prix (JGP) assignment, placing second in the short program, eighth in the free skate, and fifth overall at the event in Tallinn, Estonia. In October, they took the bronze medal at a JGP event in Zagreb, Croatia, having climbed from seventh place after the short program.

Ohanesian/Bardei won both the senior and junior national titles and were selected to represent Ukraine at the World Junior Championships in March 2015 in Tallinn. After placing twelfth in the short program, they withdrew from the competition due to Bardei's illness.

2015–2016 season
Ohanesian/Bardei's first assignment of the 2015–16 JGP series took place in late August in Riga, Latvia. Ranked first in the short and second in the free, they won the gold medal ahead of Russian pairs Anastasia Poluianova / Stepan Korotkov and Ekaterina Borisova / Dmitry Sopot. In September, they took bronze at the JGP in Linz, Austria, having ranked third in both segments, and qualified for the JGP Final. They placed fifth at the latter event, which was held in December in Barcelona, Spain.

Ohanesian/Bardei repeated as national champions on both the senior and junior levels. Their training was limited in January 2016 due to problems with the ice at their rink in Dnipropetrovsk. At the 2016 World Junior Championships in Debrecen, Hungary, the pair won a small bronze medal for the short program and finished fourth overall.

2016–2017 season
During the 2016–17 ISU Junior Grand Prix, Ohanesian/Bardei finished sixth in Tallinn and 10th in Dresden. Making their senior international debut, they placed tenth at the 2016 CS Golden Spin of Zagreb in December. They withdrew from the 2017 European Championships after Ohanesian was diagnosed with a cardiovascular health problem. In April 2017, the Ukrainian Figure Skating Federation stated that their partnership had ended.

2017–2018 season
In September 2017, Bardei appeared with Justine Brasseur on the entry list for a Quebec competition. They later withdrew from the event.

2018–2019 season
Brasseur/Bardei were scheduled to make their international debut at the 2018 CS Golden Spin of Zagreb, but withdrew from the event.  They competed at the 2019 Canadian Championships, placing fifth overall, and coming third in the free skate.  Brasseur deemed it "not our best performance", but both enjoyed competing again after some years away.

2019–2020 season
Making their international debut together, Brasseur/Bardei competed on the Challenger series at the 2019 CS Warsaw Cup.  Fourth in the short program and third in the free skate, they won the bronze medal.  Bardei noted that he had seen his parents in person for the first time since leaving Ukraine in 2017.  They placed fourth at the 2020 Canadian Championships.

In April, it was announced that they had split.

Programs

With Brasseur

With Ohanesian

Competitive highlights 
CS: Challenger Series; JGP: Junior Grand Prix

With Brasseur for Canada

With Ohanesian for Ukraine

References

External links 

 
 

1996 births
Ukrainian male pair skaters
Living people
Sportspeople from Dnipro